In the Victorian political system, the State Minister for Housing is a State Government cabinet position responsible for Housing. The Minister for Housing is responsible for the Office of Housing (formerly the Victorian Housing Commission); and is one of six state ministers responsible for the Victorian Department of Families, Fairness and Housing (DFFH).

The Housing Commission of Victoria was established in 1938. Its stated purpose of improving existing housing and to provide adequate housing for people of limited means (public housing). The Commission ceased to exist in 1984, as it became the Office of Housing.  Housing Commission remains the common colloquial term for public housing estates and developments in Victoria, particularly the inner city tower estates built in the late 1950s and 1960s by Liberal State Governments.

The Housing Commission towers were planned as a major capital work solution to urban ghettoisation. These 20 storey towers loom over many of the inner suburbs in Melbourne, and are usually built in 2–6 tower configurations. Many blocks of occupied terrace and worker cottage style housing were cleared and towers of 10 apartments a floor built, surrounded by gardens and car parks. The future high property value of the former types of housing and the gentrification of inner urban areas was not foreseen. Opponents of these projects claimed that the towers were merely turning the slums upright. One of the more vocal anti-tower campaigners in the 1960s, Barry Pullen, later became a Minister for Housing in the Cain Labor Government. Crime and substance abuse problems on the estates have indeed fluctuated to high levels over the years, as different governments apply policies to renew the residential environments.

The Victorian Minister for Housing was at the centre of the Victorian land scandals of 1973–82.

The Victorian Minister for Housing is also responsible for homelessness and the Residential Tenancies Act (the laws governing domestic renting in Victoria). Today the Office of Housing is Victoria's largest landlord, and is responsible for around 73,000 properties (23,000+ in regional Victorian towns and rural communities, 7,000+ inner city high-rise flats, 40,000+ houses, units and flats across suburban Melbourne, 1,700+ rooming house rooms and 1,800 moveable units).

Victorian State Ministers for Housing since 1945

See also
 Public housing in Australia

References

External links
Victorian Office of Housing website
Victorian Department of Human Services website – As of 1 January 2015, this department is part of the new Department of Health & Human Services (DHHS). 
Department of Health & Human Services website
Image of Housing Commission Victoria concrete pre-fabrication factory (1947)

Public housing in Australia
Housing
Victoria